Fruitgrove railway station is located on the Beenleigh line in Queensland, Australia. It is one of two stations serving the Brisbane suburb of Runcorn, the other being Runcorn station.

History
The station opened in 1935. In 2008, an upgrade of the station was completed as part of the Salisbury to Kuraby triplication project. This included converting the eastern platform to an island, and a new footbridge with lifts.

Services
Fruitgrove is served by all stops Beenleigh line services from Beenleigh and Kuraby to Bowen Hills and Ferny Grove.

Services by platform

References

External links

Fruitgrove station Queensland's Railways on the Internet
[ Fruitgrove station] TransLink travel information

Railway stations in Brisbane
Railway stations in Australia opened in 1935